The women's synchronised 10 metre platform diving competition at the 2002 Asian Games in Busan was held on 9 October at the Sajik Swimming Pool.

Schedule
All times are Korea Standard Time (UTC+09:00)

Results

References 

2002 Asian Games Reports, Page 240

External links
Results

Diving at the 2002 Asian Games